Maanshan Iron & Steel Company Limited, known as Maanshan Iron & Steel or just Masteel  (in Chinese Magang) is a Chinese listed company which engaged in steel manufacturing. The company was based in Ma'anshan, Anhui province. Since its establishment in 1993, it was controlled by the Chinese governments. However, the indirect parent company was changed to central government owned China Baowu Steel Group in June 2019, after the Group acquired 51% stake of Masteel Group, the direct parent company of the listed company from the Anhui provincial government.

History

Predecessor

The history of the steel plant could be traced back to "Ma'anshan Iron Mining Plant", established in 1953. The steel plant was renamed to "Ma'anshan Iron and Steel Company", ( or transliterated as "Ma'anshan Iron and Steel Corporation"). In the 1950s, it was considered as one of the 5 medium-sized steel plants of the People's Republic of China, behind the top 3 at that time: Anshan, Wuhan and Baotou. In the 1970s, the production process of the Group mainly comprised cooking, sintering, iron smelting, steel smelting and rolling.

Maanshan Iron & Steel Company Limited
In 1993, Maanshan Iron & Steel Company Limited was established to list the steel manufacturing assets in the stock exchanges, auxiliary divisions were not listed. The old "Ma'anshan Iron and Steel Company" was renamed to "Magang Holding Company", but remained as the parent and the holding company of the listed company. It was one of the first Chinese state-owned enterprises to be a listed company.

In 1998 the parent company was renamed into Magang (Group) Holding Co., Ltd., but commonly known as Masteel Group.

In the 2010s, the listed company had become a supplier of the train wheels and tires for China Railway High-speed trains such as Fuxing.

In 2016, as part of the national policy to retire old-age steel production facilities as well as scale-down steel production volume, Maanshan Iron & Steel started to retire some of their production line. In 2018, the retirement was completed.

Controversies 
In 2015, hundreds of lay-off workers protested the closing of a steel plant of the listed company in Hefei, the capital of Anhui province, demanding a fairer compensation. The plant was formerly known as "Hefei Iron and Steel" ( or in short ) but renamed to "Masteel (Hefei) Iron and Steel" after became a subsidiary of Maanshan Iron and Steel. It was closed down due to heavy pollution. Some part of the Hefei steel plant had become a national monument, as the first steel plant (instead of iron) of the province.

In early 2016, fellow Chinese steel maker and later the parent company Baosteel Group (now China Baowu Steel Group) was accused by US Steel Corporation of stealing commercial secrets. Baosteel rejected these allegations. The United States International Trade Commission (ITC) launched a probe into these allegations in May 2016, which Maanshan Iron and Steel was included in the investigation along with other Chinese steel maker such as Wuhan Iron and Steel, which was also part of China Baowu Steel Group since 2016.

Footnotes

References

External links 
 

Companies listed on the Shanghai Stock Exchange
Companies listed on the Hong Kong Stock Exchange
Companies established in 1993
1993 initial public offerings
1994 initial public offerings
Steel companies of China
Companies based in Anhui
H shares
Baowu
1993 establishments in China